Raymond Edward Apolskis (October 19, 1919 – June 30, 1960) was a professional football player, an  offensive lineman in the National Football League. He played eight seasons for the Chicago Cardinals and served in the U.S. Marine Corps during World War II.

Born in Cicero, Illinois, Apolskis grew up in Chicago and graduated from Fenger High School, where he earned eleven varsity letters in football, basketball, baseball, and swimming. He played college football at Marquette University in Milwaukee, Wisconsin, where he was a team captain as a sophomore. Apolskis was selected in the fifth round of the 1941 NFL Draft by the Cardinals, the 32nd overall pick.

He started as a rookie in 1941, but missed the 1943 and 1944 seasons in the Marines. Apolskis returned to play in the 1945 season and was a member of the 1947 team, the last NFL Championship for the franchise, and retired after the 1950 season.

After football, Apolskis worked for a steel company in San Mateo, California, where he died of a heart attack at age 40 in 1960.

References

External links

 FOOTBALL AND AMERICA: WW II Honor Roll

1919 births
1960 deaths
American football offensive linemen
American people of Lithuanian descent
Chicago Cardinals players
Marquette Golden Avalanche football players
People from Cicero, Illinois
Players of American football from Illinois
United States Marine Corps personnel of World War II